Thomas Paulson (born 28 December 1987 in Derby, England) is a British former competitive figure skater. He is the 2005, 2006–2007 and 2008 British national silver medalist. Paulson was a member of Team Skate GB, the British national squad, since 2002.

External links
 
 Paulson site 

1987 births
Living people
British male single skaters
Figure skaters at the 2007 Winter Universiade
Competitors at the 2009 Winter Universiade